Lutz Espig (born 5 January 1949) is a German chess Grandmaster (GM, 1983) who three times won East Germany Chess Championship (1969, 1971, 1988). European Team Chess Championship bronze medal winner (1970).

Biography 
Espig learned to play chess at the age of nine. His first club was Lok Greiz, later he played for Buna Halle. He studied mathematics and physics at the University Halle.

Espig won 1969 in Schwerin, 1971 in Strausberg and 1988 in Stralsund the East Germany Chess Championship. In 1988 he shared the title with Thomas Pähtz. In total, Lutz Espig took part in 26 German championships up to 2006, 21 of them in the GDR.

In 1972 he received the title of International Master (IM) from FIDE, and in 1983 the Grandmaster (GM) title.

Team chess 
Espig participated in the Chess Olympiad in 1988 and 1990 and participated in the European Team Chess Championship in 1970 for the East Germany chess team who won bronze medals.
In the German Chess Bundesliga, Espig played for Münchener SC 1836 in the 1990/91 season, for PSV Duisburg in the 1994/95 season and from 1999 until 2004 at SK König Plauen, where he also subsequently in the 2. Chess Bundesliga and Oberliga played.

References

External links 

Short biography at the Lasker Society (PDF; 99 kB)

1949 births
Living people
People from Greiz
German chess players
East German chess players
Chess grandmasters
University of Halle alumni